Christian Island is a large island in Georgian Bay close to the communities of Penetanguishene and Midland, Ontario. The island, with its neighbours Hope Island and Beckwith Island, is a  Ojibwa reserve, known as Christian Island Indian Reserve No. 30.

To the east of Christian Island is Giants Tomb Island, part of Awenda Provincial Park, and Beausoleil Island,  part of UNESCO's Georgian Bay Biosphere Reserve (GBBR) and part of the Georgian Bay Islands National Park, consisting of 63 small islands in Georgian Bay, near Port Severn. UNESCO's Georgian Bay Biosphere Reserve covers an area of  that stretches  along Georgian Bay's  eastern coast from Port Severn to the French River, and is the world's largest freshwater archipelago – known as The Thirty Thousand Islands.

Together with other First Nations in the area, the Beausoleil have filed a land claim for lands situated between Matchedash Bay at Coldwater and the narrows at Lake Simcoe and Lake Couchiching.  While the Chippewa Island reserve is shared among Beausoleil and two other First Nations, the two Christian Island reserves are not.

Background
Christian Island is primarily forest. The bedrock is limestone, and the soil is mainly sand, remnants of Glacial Lake Algonquin.  A prehistoric species of grass, known as Forked three-awned grass or unofficially as "Ice Age Grass," has been found on the Island.  This is linked to its  glacial beginnings. Forked three-awned grass is designated as a species at risk.

Originally, Christian Island was known by its Huron name Gahoendoe. The three islands were, in the 19th century, collectively known as the Christian Islands: Beckwith Island was called Faith Island, while Christian Island, which is the largest of the three, was known as Charity Island.

In 1649, thousands of Huron refugees and a few Jesuit missionaries from Sainte-Marie among the Hurons took refuge during the winter on the island during the Huron-Iroquois wars. The Jesuits called the island St. Joseph Island.  With insufficient food, many of the First Nations people starved during the winter.  The island's occupation by Huron Catholics and Jesuits was the basis for its name of "Christian" Island.  Specifically, it was named in honour of the Canadian Martyrs.

The Jesuits and most of the Huron refugees left the island and travelled to Quebec in the summer of 1650. The remaining Huron, along with the surviving remnants of the Petun, an Iroquoian group living at the base of the Niagara Escarpment near present-day Collingwood, left the island in 1651. The Petun had suffered serious losses in Iroquois raids in late 1649 and 1650. Their descendants eventually settled in the Detroit-Windsor area. Some were later forcibly resettled by U.S. authorities in Oklahoma.

Christian Island is inhabited by the Beausoleil First Nation. Their ancestors were nomadic, travelling from northern Georgian Bay and the United States around Lakes Huron and Michigan. The early Canadian government tried to assimilate First Nations peoples into the larger society. They encouraged the Beausoleil to give up their nomadic ways and settle at Coldwater in 1834-1842 as part of the Coldwater Narrows Reserve.  Later the Natives were displaced to Beausoleil Island in 1842, and still later, were displaced to Christian Island in 1856, where they have remained.

The First Nation has tried various ways to generate income on the small reserve, including stocking the island with pheasants for hunting, a cattle operation, a charcoal operation, and a commercial fishery.  A portion of lands are designated for cottage leasing. Today, many of the residents work on the mainland, and a growing community has sprung up on an annex of property at the Cedar Point landing. Hope and Beckwith islands are uninhabited, but are popular anchorage sites for boaters, who pay a small anchorage fee to the First Nation community.

The First Nation operates an elementary school, a health centre, and a community centre. 24-hour EMS service and a volunteer fire department operate year-round.

A ferry service connects the mainland at Cedar Point to Christian Island. A car ferry, the Sandy Graham, travels the strait between the Point and the Island on a regular schedule. Another ferry, the Indian Maiden, carries passengers only. It is capable of breaking ice up to 6" thick. A hovercraft serves the island in case of emergency. At times of severe cold, the people build an ice road between the island and the mainland. As a result of the above average ice cover in February 2014 the ice road was opened.

Christian Island has a lighthouse that marks the southern tip of the island.  It was used in the past for ships travelling from Collingwood to Penetanguishene, Midland, and Parry Sound. First lit in 1859, it is the among the oldest lighthouses in Georgian Bay and one of the six Imperial Towers.

Notable individuals

Rodney Monague (1942–2013), a survivor of the Canadian Indian residential school system, was the island's first chief after the departure of Indian agents in the 1960s. He served as chief for more than two decades, from the late 1960s until around 1990.

Canadian folk singer-songwriter Gordon Lightfoot penned a song about Christian Island in 1972 (Christian Island (Georgian Bay) which includes the lyric "In the Lee of Christian Island"), alluding to the popularity of the island as a sailing area.

Shipwrecks 
Christian Island is a favorite destination for scuba divers given the close proximity of a number of old shipwrecks (most going back a century or more) near Christian Island, and near the adjacent, uninhabited Hope Island. These include: Mapledawn (North West of Christian Island), steel freighter built in 1890 and sank 1924; Saucy Jim (East of Christian Island),  sank 1910; gain vessel Michigan (North West of  Hope Island), sank 1843; schooner Lottie Wolf (North East of Hope Island), sank 1879; and Marquette (East of Hope Island), sank 1867.

Lake Huron (in which Georgian Bay is located) is the final resting place to hundreds of other  sunken vessels, many of them of great historic value. These shipwrecks are generally well preserved, owing to the cold, fresh water habitat.

Ferry controversy

On February 13, 2016 Canadian newspapers featured a story about the island's  65-year-old ferry, the M.V. Sandy Graham, which was purchased by the government in 1998.  First Nations residents believe the aging ferry, the islands' lifeline, must be replaced in the very near future.  
"Our people have to cross day-to-day to get access to all the goods and services, as well as hospitals, medical appointments. I, in good conscience, can't continue to sail this ferry knowing that tragedy could happen out on that water,"  Christian Island Chief Roly Monague said, according to the Canadian Press. The band council had put off regular maintenance of the ferry in an effort to ensure its replacement.

The ferry broke down again mid-summer, 2016, and after a lengthy repair period was brought back into operation in November 2016. It broke down again a few weeks later, leaving residents' cars stranded on the island or mainland. The Island's official website (on November 25, 2016) states that: "Due to a significant engine repair that is required, the M.V. Sandy Graham will be out of service for an indefinite period of time as of today. Updates will be posted as they arise but due to the damage to the engine, it will be a lengthy repair." 

As reported by Roger Klein of Barrie's CTV News, Chief Mary McCue-King and Minister Carolyn Bennett held a meeting, brokered by the Beausoleil First Nation Youth Council, in January 2017.

"The current vessel over 60 years old –  it's on its last legs. It's going to break down and it's going to be gone for good. We are going to be at a standstill pretty soon if we don't come up with a solution pretty fast," Chief Mary McCue-King said at the meeting.

The new 26-30 car ferry, which will be able to break through the ice, will cost 23 million dollars plus 10 million dollars in upgrades to the dock.

"The community is prepared to partner in order to have a new ferry, and we are obviously prepared to step up and do our part. And we know the province wants to do something as well. So we are going to make this happen," Minister Carolyn Bennett, Minister of Indigenous and Northern Affairs, commented after the meeting.

The Beausoleil First Nation has committed to contributing 10 million dollars to the project.

Governance

In accordance with Indian Act election regulations, Beausoleil First Nation holds their general elections every two years. The June 23, 2018 election resulted in the following:

Chief: Guy Monague
Chief Councillor: Joanne Sandy
Councillor: Kristin Monague
Councillor: Lauraine Judith Jamieson 
Councillor: Hank Monague
Councillor: Angela Beedie
Councillor: C. Susan Copegog

Guy Monague won the general election, defeating former chief Roland Monague by 33 votes. He succeeded Mary McCue-King, who was elected in 2016 but did not seek reelection. McCue-King presently serves as the Executive  Director of the Ogemawahj Tribal Council. The newly elected Chief and Council were sworn in on July 6, 2018.

Since November 2016, Terra Sandy Roy has served as Youth Chief, with Lance Copegog as Deputy Youth Chief.

Election Results June 2021

http://www.chimnissing.ca/council.html

Oath of Office took place on June 1, 2021.

References

External links
 chimnissing.ca
 Page with pronunciations of street names
 INAC profile
 islanderonline.ca

Islands of Georgian Bay
Catholic missions of New France